Goldfinger is a surname. Notable people with the surname include:

 Arnon Goldfinger (born 1963), film director 
 Buddy "Goldfinger" Schaub, an American musician and member of the band Less Than Jake
 Chris Goldfinger, former BBC Radio 1 disc jockey (1996–2009)
 Eliot Goldfinger, an American artist
 Ernő Goldfinger (1902–1987), Hungarian-born Jewish architect and designer of furniture
 Sarah Goldfinger, television writer and producer
 Yair Goldfinger, IT manager

Fictional characters:
 Auric Goldfinger, the eponymous villain of the novel and film Goldfinger

See also
 John Palmer, nicknamed "Goldfinger", British criminal
 Samaresh Jung (born 1970, nicknamed "Goldfinger"), Indian sport shooter